St. Josaphat's Church may refer to:

Poland 
Church of St. Josaphat in Lublin

United States 
St. Josaphat Roman Catholic Church (Chicago)
St. Josaphat's Roman Catholic Church, Detroit, Michigan
St. Josaphat Roman Catholic Church in Philadelphia, Pennsylvania
St. Josaphat Ukrainian Catholic Church, Philadelphia, Pennsylvania
Basilica of St. Josaphat, Milwaukee, Wisconsin, listed on the National Register of Historic Places

See also
St. Josaphat Cathedral (disambiguation)